Simple Things is the fifteenth studio album by CCM singer-songwriter Amy Grant, released in 2003.

While Christianity praised the album, Simple Things did not have the effect of Grant's previous pop efforts from the 1990s. The album topped Billboards Christian album chart and the title track became a Top Ten Christian single, Simple Things peaked just outside the Top 20 on the Billboard 200, at No. 23. The title track peaked at the same position on the AC chart.

Track listing

Personnel 

 Amy Grant – lead vocals, backing vocals (5, 7), acoustic guitar (10)
 Keith Thomas – keyboards (1–4, 7, 8, 9), programming (1, 2, 4, 8, 9), drum programming (2, 3, 7), bass programming (3, 7), acoustic guitar (7, 8)
 Jeffrey Roach – keyboards (6)
 Bruce Gaitsch – acoustic guitar (1, 3)
 Jerry McPherson – electric guitar (1, 3, 7, 8, 9)
 Kenny Greenberg – electric guitar (1, 2, 3, 7, 8, 9)
 Will Owsley – electric guitar (1, 2, 3), backing vocals (1), acoustic guitar (2), lead guitar solo (3)
 Bobby Terry – acoustic guitar (2)
 Pat Buchanan – acoustic guitar (4)
 Tom Bukovac – acoustic guitar (4), electric guitar (4)
 Vince Gill – acoustic guitar solo (4), guest vocals (4), backing vocals (7), mandolin (8)
 Gordon Kennedy – guitars (5), electric guitar (6)
 Tim Pierce – guitars (5)
 Wayne Kirkpatrick – acoustic guitar (6), backing vocals (6)
 Ron Hemby – acoustic guitar (9), nylon guitar (9), bass (9), drums (9)
 Tommy Sims – bass (1, 2, 8)
 Craig Nelson – bass (4)
 Leland Sklar – bass (5)
 Jimmie Lee Sloas – bass (6)
 Chad Cromwell – drums (1, 7)
 Chris McHugh – drum programming (2), drums (4, 5, 6)
 Mark Hammond – drums (8)
 Eric Darken – percussion (1, 2, 5, 7, 8, 9)
 David Browning – percussion (2) 
 Rebecca Owsley – backing vocals (1)
 Katy Hudson – backing vocals (2)
 Tiffany Arbuckle Lee – backing vocals (2, 3)
 Becky Corcoran – backing vocals (3)
 Kim Keyes – backing vocals (6)
 Felicia Sorensen – backing vocals (7, 8)

Production

 Keith Thomas – producer (1–4, 7–10), executive producer, mixing
 Brown Bannister – producer (5)
 Wayne Kirkpatrick – producer (6)
 Ron Hemby – co-producer (9)
 Bill Whittington – engineer (1–4, 7–10), mixing
 Steve Bishir – engineer (5)
 JB – engineer (6)
 Hank Nirider – assistant engineer (5)
 Greg Fogie – assistant engineer 
 Kevin Edlin – assistant engineer 
 David Streit – assistant engineer 
 Chris Yoakum – ProTools editing, MIDI technician
 Scott Hull – mastering at The Hit Factory, New York City
 Shaun Shankel – production coordinator
 Darryl Bush – production coordinator
 Jennifer Sigler – production coordinator
 Traci Sterling Bishir – production manager (5)
 D'Ann McAllister – production assistance (6)
 Susan Browne – package design
 Sam Jones – photography
 Charles Dujic – stylist
 Jeanne Yang – stylist
 Kendra Richards – make-up

Charts

Weekly charts

Singles

References

Amy Grant albums
2003 albums
Albums produced by Brown Bannister
A&M Records albums